Afatauri is a beach village on the south-east coast of Tahiti.

Towns and villages in Tahiti